Erik Sorga (born 8 July 1999) is an Estonian professional footballer who plays as a striker for Bulgarian Prava Liga club Lokomotiv Plovdiv and the Estonia national team.

Career 
On 8 January 2020, Sorga signed with Loudoun United, D.C. United's reserve team. The transfer fee was reportedly $500,000. Sorga was then acquired by the first team D.C. United on 29 February 2020. Sorga made his MLS debut on 7 March 2020, in a game against Inter Miami. He scored his first goal for the team on 2 September 2020, in a 1–0 win against the New York Red Bulls.

On 12 August 2021, Sorga joined Eerste Divisie side, VVV-Venlo, for the remainder of their season.

On 8 January 2022, Sorga joined IFK Göteborg on a permanent transfer.

After a season marred by injuries and problems with fitness, Sorga signed for Bulgarian club Lokomotiv Plovdiv on a 2.5 year contract in December 2022. He made his debut for the club on 12 February 2023, starting in a 0–0 home draw against Botev Vratsa.

International career
Sorga made his senior international debut for Estonia on 8 June 2019, replacing Rauno Sappinen in the 61st minute of a 1–2 home loss to Northern Ireland in a UEFA Euro 2020 qualifying match. He started in his second match on 6 September 2019 and scored in a 1–2 home loss to Belarus.

Career statistics

Club

International 

As of match played 13 June 2022. Estonia score listed first, score column indicates score after each Sorga goal.

Honours
Flora
Meistriliiga: 2017, 2019

References

External links

1999 births
Living people
Footballers from Tallinn
Estonian footballers
Association football forwards
Esiliiga players
Meistriliiga players
FC Flora players
D.C. United players
Estonia youth international footballers
Estonia under-21 international footballers
Estonia international footballers
Expatriate soccer players in the United States
Estonian expatriate footballers
Estonian expatriate sportspeople in the United States
Tallinna JK Legion players
Major League Soccer players
Loudoun United FC players
USL Championship players
Allsvenskan players
IFK Göteborg players
Estonian expatriate sportspeople in the Netherlands
Expatriate footballers in the Netherlands
Estonian expatriate sportspeople in Sweden
Expatriate footballers in Sweden
Estonian expatriate sportspeople in Bulgaria
Expatriate footballers in Bulgaria